Groveland Township is located in LaSalle County, Illinois. It is at the very southern end of LaSalle County. As of the 2010 census, its population was 628 and it contained 299 housing units. Groveland Township was formed from Eagle Township sometime prior to September, 1856.

Geography

Demographics

References

External links
US Census
City-data.com
Illinois State Archives

Townships in LaSalle County, Illinois
Townships in Illinois
1856 establishments in Illinois
Populated places established in 1856